Dolichorrhiza is a genus of flowering plants in the sunflower family.

 Species
 Dolichorrhiza caucasica (M.Bieb.) Galushko - Armenia, Republic of Georgia, Azerbaijan
 Dolichorrhiza correvoniana (Albov) Galushko - Republic of Georgia
 Dolichorrhiza persica (Boiss.) B.Nord. - Iran
 Dolichorrhiza renifolia (C.A.Mey.) Galushko - Republic of Georgia

References

Senecioneae
Asteraceae genera